The first season of the animated television series BoJack Horseman premiered exclusively via Netflix's web streaming service on August 22, 2014. The season consists of 12 episodes.

While the first half of the season received mixed reviews, the second half of the season received much more positive reviews. Ben Travers of IndieWire believed one possible reason for mixed reviews of the show was critics reviewing only the first half of the season. Many critics cited the seventh episode "Say Anything" as being the turning point of the season, with it changing drastically in tone and developing a darker, deeper meaning. This change was so drastic it resulted in IndieWire changing its policy to only review entire seasons of shows on Netflix, instead of just the first six episodes, which would have boosted BoJack Horsemans C+ grade. This change in perception is starkly noticeable in the show's other seasons, which received critical acclaim on Rotten Tomatoes and Metacritic.

Cast and characters

Main
 Will Arnett as BoJack Horseman and Butterscotch Horseman
 Alison Brie as Diane Nguyen, Joelle Clarke, and Vincent Adultman
 Amy Sedaris as Princess Carolyn and Sharona
 Paul F. Tompkins as Mr. Peanutbutter and Andrew Garfield
 Aaron Paul as Todd Chavez

Recurring

Guest

Episodes

Reception
The review aggregator Rotten Tomatoes reported a score of 71%, based on 28 reviews. The site's critical consensus states, "It's intermittently funny, but in most respects, BoJack Horseman pales in comparison to similar comedies." On Metacritic, the season received a rating of 59 out of 100, based on 13 critics, indicating "mixed or average reviews".

Erik Adams' review of the first six episodes gave the series a C+ grade; in the review, Adams wrote that the show "spoofs the emptiness of celebrity, but does so without any novelty or true insight". At Slate, Willa Paskin was more enthused. "[It] is perhaps a little more clever than it is uproariously funny, but it is often very clever, and, moreover, well-tuned to the ludicrousness of the sort of low-level fame that surrounds BoJack". She likened it to 30 Rock in its ability to "[present] big ideas without having to commit to them".

Chris Mitchell from Popzara was equally optimistic about the show's future, saying that "Fans of FX's Archer or Fox's Bob's Burgers will definitely want to check this one out, as its rapid-fire delivery is always consciously spot-on". The New York Times described the show as "hilarious and ribald". Margaret Lyons of Vulture gave a positive review, describing it as "radically sad. I love it".

However, the second half of the season received much more positive reviews. Ben Travers of Indiewire believed one possible reason for mixed reviews of the show was critics reviewing only the first half of the season, with the second half changing drastically in tone and developing a darker and deeper meaning. This change was so drastic it resulted in Indiewire changing its policy to only review entire seasons of shows on Netflix, instead of just the first six episodes, which would have boosted BoJack Horseman's C+ grade.

References

2014 American television seasons
BoJack Horseman seasons